The Ashland Colonels were a Mountain State League minor league baseball team based in Ashland, Kentucky, United States that played from 1939 to 1942. They were affiliated with the Chicago Cubs in their final year of existence.

They were the first team based in Ashland since the Ashland-Catlettsburg Twins in 1912 and the last team from that city until the Tri-State Tomahawks of the Frontier League arrived in 1993.

Notable players and managers include Ray French, Tommy Thevenow, Bill Kennedy, Nelson Burbrink, Moe Burtschy, Chuck Kress, Ed Hock and Pete Elko.

References

Baseball teams established in 1939
Defunct minor league baseball teams
1939 establishments in Kentucky
1942 disestablishments in Kentucky
Baseball teams disestablished in 1942
Defunct baseball teams in Kentucky
Chicago Cubs minor league affiliates
Mountain State League teams
Ashland, Kentucky